Pre-ejaculate (also known as pre-ejaculatory fluid, pre-seminal fluid or Cowper's fluid, and colloquially as pre-cum) is a clear, colorless, viscous fluid that is emitted from the urethra of the penis during sexual arousal. It is similar in composition to semen but has distinct chemical differences. The presence of sperm in the fluid is variable from low to absent. Pre-ejaculate functions as a lubricant and an acid neutralizer.

Origin and composition
The fluid is discharged from the urethra of the penis during arousal, masturbation, foreplay or at an early stage during sexual intercourse, some time before the individual fully reaches orgasm and semen is ejaculated. It is primarily produced by the bulbourethral glands (Cowper's glands), with the glands of Littré (the mucus-secreting urethral glands) also contributing. The amount of fluid that is issued varies widely among individuals. The outflow of pre-ejaculate is independent of mechanical stimulation of the penis or an erection, and can be triggered by erotic thoughts alone.

Pre-ejaculate fluid contains chemicals associated with semen, such as acid phosphatase, but other semen markers, such as gamma-glutamyltransferase, are absent.

Function and risks
Pre-ejaculate neutralizes residual acidity in the urethra caused by urine, creating a more favorable environment for the passage of sperm. The vagina is normally acidic, so the deposit of pre-ejaculate before the emission of semen may change the vaginal environment to promote sperm survival. Pre-ejaculate also acts as a lubricant during sexual activity, and plays a role in semen coagulation.

Low levels or no sperm exists in pre-ejaculate, although studies examined small samples of men. Two contrary studies found mixed evidence, including individual cases of a high sperm concentration. Popular belief – dating to a 1966 Masters and Johnson study – stated that pre-ejaculate may contain sperm that can cause pregnancy, which is a common basis of argument against the use of coitus interruptus (withdrawal) as a contraceptive method.

Studies have demonstrated the presence of HIV in most pre-ejaculate samples from infected men.

Overproduction
In rare cases, an individual may produce an excessive amount of pre-ejaculate fluid that can be a cause of embarrassment or irritation. A few case reports have indicated satisfactory results when such individuals are treated with a 5-alpha-reductase inhibitor, such as finasteride.

See also
Vaginal lubrication

References

Semen
Ejaculation
Men's health